Guo Mei (born January, 1968) is a hematologist and associate director of 307th Hospital of Chinese People’s Liberation Army and deputy director of Radiation Research Institute.

Guo Mei is a Chinese physician who works with Huisheng Ai. She graduated from Academy of Military Medical Sciences and got master degree in 1997. She is a pre-eminent expert in the use of hematopoietic stem cell transplantation for treating radiation injuries and blood disease, especially leukemia, aplastic anemia and myelodysplastic syndrome.

She is one of the founders of microtransplantation. Years of education and research experience in microtransplantation have earned her a large amount of respect from her colleagues. Her expertise is reflected in the awards and recognition she has received.

Guo Mei brings her passion and knowledge for treating blood disease with microtransplantation in 307th Hospital, and with an equally dedicated medical and support team, works hard every day to improve the quality of lives of the patients.

Research
1998 Dr. Guo and her medical team developed "Study of HLA-matched nonmyeloablative transplantation in the treatment of hematological malignancies" successfully.

2004 The study of HLA haploidentical blood related and unrelated matched donors nonmyeloablative transplantation for the treatment of blood diseases.

2005 Treatment of Jining serious radiation accidents and extremely severe bone marrow and intestinal radiation

2006 Developed an original creativity of microtransplantation for the treatment of leukemia. This technology opens up new opportunities for treating leukemia in world.

From 2010 to 2015, she took part in 12 projects of national 863 and provincial projects. As the first applicants, she took five scientific research projects, including the National Ministry of science and Technology Department project, National 11th Five-Year Plan key project of scientific and technological and National 12th Five-Year Plan key project of scientific and technological.

Honours
First prize of military medical achievement award in June 2005 
Military medical achievement award in March 2006
Second prize of military medical achievement award in September 2007
Honourable title of the 3rd merit in 2008

Her accomplishments include over 100 published research articles, including four articles that have been recorded by SCI (JCO: 18.4, Blood: 10.55, BBMT 3.86) aplastic anemia and myelodysplastic syndrome. She has co-authored five monographs, including "Hematopoietic stem cell transplantation clinical and basic," "Modern leukemia study," "Clinical and basic research of radiation sickness," and two more books.

Academic papers

 2011 "Infusion of HLA-mismatched peripheral blood stem cells improves the outcome of chemotherapy for acute myeloid leukemia in elderly patients", published in Blood
 2012 "HLA-Mismatched Stem-Cell Microtransplantation as Postremission Therapy for Acute Myeloid Leukemia: Long-Term Follow-Up" in J Clin Oncol
 2015 "Efficacy of Switching to 2nd Generation of Tyrosine Kinase Inhibitor on CML Patients at Poor Responses to Imatinib"
 2014 "Comparison of conditioning regimens containing or no fludarabine in nonmyeloablative allogeneic peripheral blood stem cell transplantation"
 2014 The Existence and Role of Microchimerism after Microtransplantion
2014 Malposition of peripherally inserted central catheter: experience from 3012 cancer patients
2014 Establishment and identification of a h-2 completely mismatched microtransplantation model of leukemia mouse
 2013 Abnormality of blood coagulation indexes in patients with de novo acute leukemia and its clinical significance
 2014 Risk factors analysis of cytomegalovirus infection after nonmyeloablative allogeneic peripheral blood stem cell transplantation 
 2014 Severe acute radiation syndrome: treatment of a lethally 60Co-source irradiated accident victim in China with HLA-mismatched peripheral blood stem cell transplantation and mesenchymal stem cells
 2013 Haploidentical nonmyeloablative allogeneic peripheral blood stem cell transplantation for treatment of refractory or relapsed leukemia: long-term follow-up
 2013 Changes of Th1/Th2/Th17 in patients received non-myeloablative haploidentical hematopoietic stem cell transplantation detected by flow cytometric bead array
2013 Different changes of serum cytokines following HLA-identical and HLA haploidentical non-myeloablative allogeneic hematopoietic stem cell transplantation
 2013 Clinical investigation of refractory lymphoma with HLA-mismatched stem-cell microtransplantation
2011 Role of G-CSF in the proliferation, differentiation and cell cycle distribution of mouse thymocytes after acute radiation
2011 "CM-DiI labeled mesenchymal stem cells homed to thymus inducing immune recovery of mice after haploidentical bone marrow transplantation", published on Int Immunopharmacol.
2011 Expression of NOV and BNIP3 gene in mouse myelomonocytic leukemia and its significance
2011 Relationship between WT1-specific T-cell subsets and graft-versus-host disease after nonmyeloablative allogeneic transplantation
2011 "WT1-specific CTL cells of recipient origin may exist in the peripheral blood of patients achieving full donor chimerism soon after nonmyeloablative transplantation", published on Clin Transplant.
 2010 Application of HLA-A*0201/WT1 pentamer combined with intracellular IFNgamma+ staining in detecting circulating WT1 specific T cells in leukemia
2010 "Comparison of Wilms' tumor antigen 1-specific T lymphocyte generation soon after nonmyeloablative allergenic stem-cell transplantation in acute and chronic leukemia patients", published in Int J Hematol.
 2009 Changes of lymphocyte subsets in acute leukemia patients after HLA-mismatched nonmyeloablative hematopoietic stem cell transplantation
 2010 "Efficacy of bone marrow-derived mesenchymal stem cells in the treatment of sclerodermatous chronic graft-versus-host disease: clinical report", published in Biol Blood Marrow Transplant
2009 A modified haploidentical nonmyeloablative transplantation without T cell depletion for high-risk acute leukemia: successful engraftment and mild GVHD" published in Biol Blood Marrow Transplant.2008 Acute graft versus host disease in non-myeloablative allogeneic stem cell transplantation2007 Effects of mesenchymal stem cells on cell cycle and apoptosis of hematopoietic tissue cells in irradiated mice 2007 Effect of bone marrow mesenchymal stem cells on immunoregulation in H-2 haploidentical bone marrow transplantation mice2007 Comparison of efficiencies mobilizing stem cells into peripheral blood in healthy donors by different schemes with G-CSF2006 "Ex vivo expansion and in vivo infusion of bone marrow-derived Flk-1+CD31-CD34- mesenchymal stem cells: feasibility and safety from monkey to human", published in Stem Cells Dev.2006 Kinetic study of various cytokine mRNA expressions in rhesus treated with haploidentical peripheral blood stem cell transplantation2005 Establishment of a rhesus haploidentical hematopoietic stem cell and mesenchymal stem cell transplantation model by nonmyeloablative conditioning2005 Establishment and application of a method for assessing hemopoietic chimerism in rhesus after allogeneic stem cell transplantation2005 "Establishment of rhesus model for haploidentical hematopoietic stem cell transplantation with nonmyeloablative conditioning", published in Zhongguo Shi Yan Xue Ye Xue Za Zhi 2005 Study on biological characteristics of cultured rhesus mesenchymal stem cells2003 Comparison of conditioning regimens containing or no fludarabine in nonmyeloablative allogeneic peripheral blood stem cell transplantation2003 Clinical significance of formation and conversion of hematopoietic mixed chimerism in nonmyeloablative allogeneic stem cell transplantation2003 The clinical research of nonmyeloablative allogeneic peripheral blood hematopoietic stem cells transplantation for hematological diseases2001 Nonmyeloablative Allogeneic Peripheral Blood Hematopoietic Stem Cell Transplantation for Therapy of Hematologic Diseases2012 Estimation of the biological dose received by five victims of a radiation accident using three different cytogenetic tools2012 HLA-Mismatched Stem-Cell Microtransplantation As Postremission Therapy for Acute Myeloid Leukemia: Long-Term Follow-Up2012 Effects of IAT and MAT chemotherapeutic regimens in patients with refractory or relapsed acute myeloid leukemia 2012 Effective modulation of CD4CD25 regulatory T and NK cells in malignant patients by combination of interferon-α and interleukin-22012 Clinical study of bortezomib for treating multiple myeloma with renal impairment''
2012 Clinical analysis of invastive fungal infections in patients with hematologic malignancies
 2012 Microtransplantation with Decitabine and Cytarabine Improves Patient Outcomes in Myelodysplastic Syndromes

References

External links

 http://www.307hospital.com/logo.jhtml
 http://www.mstleukemiaclinic.com/index.html
 http://www.mstleukemiaclinic.com/About_MST/Medical_Experts/Medical_Experts/55.html
 http://www.newcelltech.com/a/yxal/kfbl/

Living people
Chinese hematologists
Chilean women physicians
1968 births
20th-century Chinese physicians
21st-century Chinese physicians
20th-century women physicians
21st-century women physicians
People's Republic of China science writers